Gyrographa is a genus of lichen-forming fungi in the family Roccellaceae. The genus was circumscribed in 2014 by Damien Ernst and Anders Tehler, with Gyrographa gyrocarpa assigned as the type species. This lichen, originally described by Julius von Flotow in 1825, was first placed in the genus Opegrapha. Species in the genus have a crustose thallus lacking a cortex, and a dark brown prothallus. The photobiont partner is trentepholioid. The  is thick and carbonised, and the ascospores lack a gelatinous sheath; these characteristics distinguish it from Opegrapha species. The genus name alludes to the  ascomata of the type species.

Species
 Gyrographa fecunda  – Australia
 Gyrographa gyrocarpa 
 Gyrographa nigrofusca  – India
 Gyrographa saxigena

References

Roccellaceae
Taxa described in 2014
Lichen genera
Arthoniomycetes